Lieutenant-General William Keppel (5 November 1727 – March 1782) was a British Army officer and Member of Parliament.

Life
He was born the third son of Willem van Keppel, 2nd Earl of Albemarle, and educated at Westminster school.

He joined the British Army as an Ensign in the 2nd Foot Guards in 1744, and was promoted to the rank of lieutenant in 1745. He transferred as captain-lieutenant to the 1st Foot Guards in 1751, and was promoted captain and lieutenant-colonel in 1752 and a colonel of the Army in 1760. On 17 December 1761 he was appointed colonel of the 56th Regiment of Foot, which he commanded until 1765. He was made major-general in 1762.

In 1762, he took part (with his brothers the Earl of Albemarle and Hon. Augustus Keppel) in the British expedition against Cuba, and directed the storming of Morro Castle. In 1763, he succeeded Albemarle as British Governor of Cuba. The island was returned to Spain in July 1763.

On 31 May 1765, he was appointed colonel of the 14th Regiment of Foot, which he commanded until 1775, during which time he was elevated to lieutenant-general (1772).

From 1767 until his death, he was a Member of Parliament for Chichester.

He was Commander-in-Chief, Ireland in 1773. On 18 October 1775 he was appointed colonel of the 12th Royal Lancers, which he commanded until his death. He was Gentleman of the Horse to King George III of Great Britain and died unmarried in 1782.

References

1727 births
1782 deaths
People educated at Westminster School, London
Willem Keppel (British Army officer)
British Army lieutenant generals
Colonial heads of Cuba
Commanders-in-Chief, Ireland
Pages of Honour
Younger sons of earls
56th Regiment of Foot officers
12th Royal Lancers officers
British Army personnel of the Seven Years' War
Members of the Parliament of Great Britain for English constituencies
British MPs 1761–1768
British MPs 1768–1774
British MPs 1774–1780
British MPs 1780–1784
Coldstream Guards officers
Grenadier Guards officers